Iglesia de San Esteban (Ciaño) is a church in Asturias, Spain. It was established in the late 12th century.

Churches in Asturias
12th-century establishments in the Kingdom of León
12th-century Roman Catholic church buildings in Spain
Romanesque architecture in Asturias
Bien de Interés Cultural landmarks in Asturias